The Indian Wells Masters, also known as the Indian Wells Open and BNP Paribas Open, is an annual tennis tournament usually held in early- and mid-March at the Indian Wells Tennis Garden in Indian Wells, California, United States.  The owner is Larry Ellison, executive chairman and co-founder of Oracle. The tournament director is former world No. 2 player Tommy Haas. The tournament is a Masters 1000 event on the men's tour and is a WTA 1000 event on the women's tour.

Between 1974 and 1976 it was non-tour event and between 1977 and 1989 it was held as part of the Grand Prix Tennis Tour. The event is one of two tour events (along with the Miami Open), other than the Majors, in which main draw play extends beyond eight days. The women's main draw usually starts on Wednesday and the men's main draw starts on Thursday. Both finals are held on Sunday of the following week. Both singles main draws include 96 players in a 128-player grid, with the 32 seeded players getting a bye (a free pass) to the second round.

The tournament is played on hardcourt and is the best-attended tennis tournament outside the four Grand Slam tournaments (475,372 in total attendance during the 2019 event); it is often called the "fifth Grand Slam". The Indian Wells Tennis Garden has the second-largest permanent tennis stadium in the world, behind New York City's Arthur Ashe Stadium. The Indian Wells Masters event is the premier tennis tournament within the Western United States and is the second largest tennis tournament throughout the United States and the Americas, behind the US Open (Grand Slam tournament held at the USTA Billie Jean King National Tennis Center in New York City within the Eastern United States).

Location
Indian Wells lies in the Coachella Valley (Palm Springs area), about 125 miles east of downtown Los Angeles.

The tournament is played in the Indian Wells Tennis Garden (built in 2000) which has 29 tennis courts, including the 16,100-seat main stadium, which is the second largest tennis-specific stadium in the world. After the 2013 BNP Paribas Open, the Indian Wells Tennis Garden started an expansion and upgrade of its facilities that includes a new 8,000 seat Stadium 2. The revamping of the tennis center also included a "Pro Purple" interior court color created specifically for the ATP Masters Series and first used at Indian Wells, citing the purple color being 180 degrees and exactly opposite the yellow of the ball.

History
The tournament was founded by former tennis pros Charlie Pasarell and Raymond Moore.

Originally the women's tournament was held a week before the men's event. In 1996, the championship became one of the few fully combined events on both the Association of Tennis Professionals and Women's Tennis Association tours.

The BNP Paribas Open has become one of the largest events on both the men's and women's tours. In 2004, the tournament expanded to a multi-week 96-player field. Winning the BNP Paribas Open and the Miami Open back to back has been colloquially termed the Sunshine Double. Dubbed the "Grand Slam of the West", it is the most-attended tennis tournament in the world other than the four Majors, with over 450,000 visitors during the 2015 event.

In 2009, the tournament and the Indian Wells Tennis Garden were sold to Larry Ellison.

On March 8, 2020, the tournament was postponed, and later canceled, to halt the potential spread of COVID-19.

Williams sisters controversy

Venus and Serena Williams refused to play the Indian Wells tournament from 2001 to 2014 despite threats of financial sanctions and ranking point penalties. The two were scheduled to play in the 2001 semifinal but Venus withdrew due to an injury. Amid speculation of match fixing, the crowd for the final loudly booed Serena when she came out to play the final and continued to boo her intermittently through the entire match, even to the point of cheering unforced errors and double faults. Williams won the tournament and was subsequently booed during the awards ceremony. The following month at the Ericsson Open, Richard Williams, Serena and Venus's father, claimed racial slurs were directed at him while in the stands, although there is no definitive evidence of this. 

After a phone call from Larry Ellison (the multi-billionaire founder of Oracle, tennis enthusiast and most recent owner of the tournament), Serena Williams returned to Indian Wells in 2015, ending her 14-year boycott of the event. Venus Williams ended her boycott by competing in Indian Wells in 2016.

Past finals

Men's singles

Women's singles

Men's doubles

Women's doubles

Records

Men's singles

Women's singles

See also

ATP Tour
 ATP Tour Masters 1000
 Grand Prix Super Series
 List of ATP Tour top-level tournament singles champions
 Tennis Masters Series records and statistics

WTA Tour
 WTA 1000 tournaments
 WTA Premier Mandatory/5
 WTA Tier I tournaments
 List of WTA Tour top-level tournament singles champions

Notes

References

External links

 Official tournament website
 ATP tournament profile
 Indian Wells Tennis Garden
 Official Tourism Agency of the greater Palm Springs area: Information on hotels, restaurants and more

 
Tennis tournaments in California
Hard court tennis tournaments
WTA Tour
Sports in Riverside County, California
Recurring sporting events established in 1974
ATP Tour Masters 1000